Onthophagus ebenus is a species of bug that was first described by Louis Péringuey in the year of 1888. No sub-species are listed at Catalogue of Life.

References

Scarabaeinae
Beetles described in 1888